Meadow Lake 105A is an Indian reserve of the Flying Dust First Nation in Saskatchewan. It is 7 miles southwest of Meadow Lake. In the 2016 Canadian Census, it recorded a population of 0 living in 0 of its 1 total private dwellings.

References

Indian reserves in Saskatchewan
Division No. 17, Saskatchewan